Glencoe is a locality in the central Southland region of New Zealand's South Island. The nearest town of significant size is Mataura to the east, while the city of Invercargill is to the southwest.

In February 1999, a cairn was dedicated in Glencoe to commemorate the 1692 Massacre of Glencoe.

References 

Populated places in Southland, New Zealand